Gela is the debut studio album by Indigenous Australian rapper Baker Boy, released on 15 October 2021 through Island Records Australia and Universal Music Australia. Gela features guest appearances from JessB, G Flip, Jerome Farah, Thando, Yirrmal, Lara Andallo, and Uncle Jack Charles, alongside production from former TZU member Pip Norman, Willie Tafa, Carl Dimataga, Morgan Jones and Farah.

Gela was supported by seven singles—"Cool as Hell", "Meditjin", "Move", "Ride", "My Mind", "Butterflies", and "Survive".

At the J Awards of 2021, the album was nominated for Australian Album of the Year. At the National Indigenous Music Awards 2022, the album won Album of the Year.

At the 2022 ARIA Music Awards, the album won Album of the Year, Best Solo Artist, Best Hip Hop Release/Rap Release and Best Cover Art.

At the 2022 Music Victoria Awards, the album won Best Victorian Album.

Background
Baker's debut album follows several years of releasing stand-alone singles. On 18 January 2019, Triple J published a piece detailing their most anticipated albums of the year, which featured Baker's forthcoming debut on the list. A representative for him detailed the album's musicality, revealing it would include "dancehall, traditional, trap, G-Funk and your original Baker Boy styles." On 25 January 2020, in an interview with The Sydney Morning Heralds Craig Mathieson, Baker discussed his intention to release an album before the end of the year, stating: "Finishing an album is one of my main priorities for this year. It's almost finished, so I want everyone to get ready for what's going to happen." On 27 March, Baker premiered the single "Move" on Triple J's Sally & Erica. In an accompanying interview, he revealed details of the album, saying he was "super-pumped" about it, and was "three or two" songs away from completing it.

Recording
During recording for the album alongside various producers, Baker worked 14-hour days from 10am to midnight (AEST).

Release
On 13 April 2018, Baker first teased a debut album alongside the premiere of "Mr. La Di Da Di" in a Triple J interview, stating that he hoped to release an album or EP "by July or even two months after that", adding "if I can't do it this year, I'll have two albums next year." On 4 May 2018, he further teased his debut album, stating he was "currently working on finishing up [his] album. Baker initially intended to release his debut album in mid-2019 and then August, and again in 2020. On 24 March 2021, in an interview with Triple J's Bryce & Ebony, Baker reaffirmed his intention to release a debut album. On 16 July, a day after the release of "My Mind", Baker announced that the album would be titled Gela and revealed its release date of 15 October. Gela has been described as highly anticipated.

Promotion

Singles
Gela was supported by seven singles.

"Cool as Hell" was released on 25 January 2019 as the album's lead single.

"Meditjin", featuring JessB, was released as the second single on 21 November 2019.

"Move" was released as the third single on 27 March 2020.

"Ride", featuring Yirrmal, was released as the fourth single on 25 March 2021.

"My Mind", featuring G Flip, was released on 15 July 2021 as the album's fifth single.

"Butterflies" was released on 17 September 2021 as the album's sixth single.

"Survive", featuring Uncle Jack Charles, was released alongside the album on 15 October 2021 as the seventh and final single.

Marketing
On 19 July 2021, Baker made an appearance as a guest host on eighth episode of the ninth series of Have You Been Paying Attention?, during which he discussed his forthcoming album and the release of his single "My Mind".

Artwork
According to Rolling Stone Australia, Gelas front cover features "striking artwork by iconic street artist Adnate [that] perfectly encapsulates the concept behind the record, which sees Baker Boy coming to terms with the sudden fame he's experienced in the past few years, while still maintaining close ties to his family and community in Arnhem Land."

Critical reception
Andrew McMillen of the Australian praised the album as "impressive and versatile", writing that Baker "balance[d] poppy accessibility with battle-ready fierceness and deeper messages."

Track listing

Personnel

Musicians
 Danzal Baker – main artist, associated performer, vocals, writing 
Other musicians
 Georgia Filpo – vocals, writing 
 Yirrmal Marika – vocals, writing 
 Dallas Woods – writing 
 Pip Norman – writing, production 
 Justin Marshall – performing, percussion 
 Lachlan Mclean – performing, baritone saxophone, tenor 
 Luke Dubber – performing, synthesiser 
 Tristan Ludowyk – performing, trumpet 
 Brendan Tuckerman – lyricist 
 Carl Dimataga – lyricist 
 Jesse Ferris – lyricist 
 Morgan Jones – lyricist 
 James Iheakanwa – lyricist 
 Willie Tafa – lyricist 
 Jessica Bourke – vocals, writing 
 Jerome Farah – vocals , writing

Technical
 Matt Colton – mastering, studio personnel 
 Andrei Eremin – mixing, studio personnel 
 Carl Dimataga – production 
 Morgan Jones – production, studio personnel 
 Neville Clark – mastering engineer, studio personnel 
 Dave Hammer – mixing, studio personnel 
 Willie Tafa – production, engineering, studio personnel 
 Jerome Farah – production, engineering, studio personnel

Charts

Release history

Notes

References

External links
 

2021 debut albums
Albums produced by Jerome Farah
Albums produced by Pip Norman
ARIA Award-winning albums
Baker Boy albums
Island Records Australia albums
Universal Music Australia albums